"Invisible" is a song by American rock band Linkin Park. It was released from their seventh studio album, One More Light. The song was written by Mike Shinoda and Justin Parker. The song is sung by Mike Shinoda with Chester Bennington on backing vocals. The song premiered on May 10, 2017 at Zane Lowe's World Record show on Beats 1.

Writing and recording
Mike Shinoda met with English songwriter and producer Justin Parker in London for a writing session during The Hunting Party Tour. Shinoda later told Ticketmaster, "I did a couple of stopovers in London on the way back from the Hunting Party tour and worked with two different songwriters and really enjoyed it. I thought it was super fun and saw merit in keeping that going. I took the songs back to the band and asked them what they thought. They loved the material, first and foremost." One of those tracks was "Invisible", a song that deals with Shinoda wanting to concentrate on being a father.

Throughout the process, both Shinoda and Bennington recorded vocals for the song, but since "Invisible" is Shinoda's story, he decided he should be the one singing on the final version. The song was written about his kids and the thought that when they get older and become teenagers, it will be harder to discipline them. According to him, "Invisible" sends the listener to that moment when, in a parental or mentoring situation, you have to tell your kids something they don't wanna hear and you want them to know you're doing it because you care, not because you want to hurt their feelings.

Release and promotion
The song was released from their seventh studio album One More Light. It was released digitally on May 10, 2017. The band released a lyric video of the song on the same day. As of December 26, 2017, the lyric video has gained over 12.1 million views.

Live performances
The song's first live performance was in front of the audience who were in attendance at the taping of James Corden's The Late Late Show in February. The performance aired on the June 12, 2017 episode. The first public performance was during Maximus Festival 2017 at the Santiago, Chile show. The track has been performed multiple times since then.

Personnel
Credits from streaming website.

Linkin Park
 Mike Shinoda – lead vocals, keyboard, piano
 Chester Bennington – backing vocals
 Brad Delson – guitars, backing vocals
 Phoenix – bass guitar, backing vocals
 Joe Hahn – programming, sampler, backing vocals
 Rob Bourdon – drums, backing vocals

Additional musicians
 Jesse Shatkin – additional keyboards, additional programming

Production
 Produced by Mike Shinoda and Brad Delson
 Co-produced by Jesse Shatkin
 Additional Production by RAC
 Written by Mike Shinoda and Justin Parker
 Vocal production by Emily Wright
 Engineered by Mike Shinoda, Ethan Mates and Josh Newell
 Engineering assisted by Alejandro Baima and Warren Willis
 Mixed by Serban Ghenea
 Mixing engineered by John Hanes
 Technician: Jerry Johnson

Charts

References

2017 songs
Linkin Park songs
Warner Records singles
American pop rock songs
Songs written by Mike Shinoda
Songs written by Justin Parker
Rock ballads